Chen Xiao (陳僖公 died 796BC), better known by his posthumous name Duke Xi, was a Chinese noble of the Zhou Kingdom. He was the seventh ruler of the state of Chen, with the rank of duke.

Life
Chen Xiao was the son of Duke Ning of Chen, who was posthumously known as Duke You. Prince Xiao became duke of Chen upon his father's death in 832BC.

He died in 796BC and was posthumously honored under the name Chén Xīgōng. He was succeeded by his son Prince Ling, who was posthumously known as Duke Wu.

References

Citations

Bibliography

Monarchs of Chen (state)
9th-century BC Chinese monarchs
8th-century BC Chinese monarchs
796 BC deaths